Gunnel Linde (14 October 1924 – 12 June 2014) was a Swedish writer who has written over forty children's books, among them Den vita stenen and I Am a Werewolf Cub. 

In 1971, she was one of the founders of BRIS ("Barnens rätt i samhället", in English Children's Rights in Society). 

She has received the Swedish Nils Holgersson Plaque in 1965 (for the book Den vita stenen) and the Astrid Lindgren Prize in 1978.

References

Further reading 
 

Swedish-language writers
1924 births
2014 deaths